Classical Speed is a sub-series of the Dancemania Speed compilation series, with uptempo dance remixes of famous classical music compositions.

History
The first issue, Classical Speed, was recorded by crews including some highly recognized dance music producers mainly from Germany and Italy, and was released on December 11, 2002, featuring tracks originally composed by famous classical music composers such as Beethoven, Mozart, and Tchaikovsky.

The second issue, Classical Speed 2, was released on August 18, 2004 with tracks including "Jupiter" as the intro, and 19 other tracks, including technically non-classical compositions such as "Jazz Suite Waltz", "Amazing Grace", and "Stars and Stripes Forever".

Releases

Classical Speed
Classical Speed was released on December 11, 2002. The non-stop mixing was done by the team MST. The album's overall average tempo is 181 bpm.

Classical Speed 2
Classical Speed 2 was released on August 18, 2004. The non-stop mixing was done by the team KCP. The album's overall average tempo is 182 bpm.

References

Dancemania Speed
Classical crossover albums